Knight of the shire was the formal title for a member of parliament (MP) representing a county constituency in the British House of Commons,  from its origins in the medieval Parliament of England until the Redistribution of Seats Act 1885 ended the practice of each county (or shire) forming a single constituency. The corresponding titles for other MPs were burgess in a borough constituency  (or citizen if the borough had city status) and baron for a Cinque Ports constituency. Knights of the shire had more prestige than burgesses, and sitting burgesses often stood for election for the shire in the hope of increasing their standing in Parliament.

The name "knight of the shire" originally implied that the representative had to be a knight, and the writ of election referred to a belted knight until the 19th century; but by the 14th century men who were not knights were commonly elected. An act of Henry VI stipulated that those eligible for election were knights and "such notable esquires and gentlemen as have estates sufficient to be knights, and by no means of the degree of yeoman".

From  Simon de Montfort's Parliament in 1265, each shire sent two knights, and the number was standard until 1826 when Yorkshire gained two additional knights after the disfranchisement of Grampound borough. Under the Great Reform Act of 1832 counties with larger populations sent more knights than smaller ones. The Redistribution of Seats Act 1885 split each multiple-seat shire into multiple single-seat divisions. This change, together with the concomitant standardisation of the franchise, means that county and borough constituencies now differ only slightly, as to election expenses and their type of returning officer.

The term  "knight of the shire" has been used more recently in a tongue-in-cheek manner for senior  Conservative Party backbenchers representing rural constituencies in England and Wales.

Middle Ages 
The precursor to the English parliamentary system was a Magnum Concilium or great council, an advice chamber to the king consisting of peers, ecclesiastics, and Knights of the Shire (with the king summoning two of these from each county). In 1264, this council evolved to include representatives from the boroughs (burgesses), requiring that all members be elected (Montfort's Parliament). The parliament gained legislative powers in 1295 (the Model Parliament). In the following century Edward III split parliament into its current bicameral structure, which includes the House of Commons and the House of Lords, in 1341. It opted in 1376 to appoint Sir Peter de la Mare to convey to the Lords complaints about heavy taxes, demands for an accounting of the royal expenditures, and criticism of the king's management of the military. Although de la Mare was imprisoned for his actions, many recognised the value of a single representative voice for the Commons. Accordingly, an office of Speaker of the House of Commons was created. Mare was soon released after the death of Edward III and became the Speaker of the House again in 1377.

Until legislation in 1430, the franchise (electorate) for elections of knights of the shire was not restricted to forty shilling freeholders.

Discussing the original county franchise, historian Charles Seymour suggested, "It is probable that all free inhabitant householders voted and that the parliamentary qualification was, like that which compelled attendance in the county court, merely a 'resiance' or residence qualification." He goes on to explain why Parliament decided to legislate about the county franchise. "The Act of 1430," he said, "after declaring that elections had been crowded by many persons of low estate, and that confusion had thereby resulted, accordingly enacted that the suffrage should be limited to persons qualified by a freehold of 40s".

The Parliament of England legislated the new uniform county franchise, in the statute 8 Henry VI, c. 7. However the Chronological Table of the Statutes does not mention such a 1430 Act, as it was included in the Consolidated Statutes as a recital in the Electors of Knights of the Shire Act 1432 (10 Henry VI, c. 2), which amended and re-enacted the 1430 law to make clear that the resident of a county had to have a forty shilling freehold in that county in order to be a voter there.
 
Over the course of time, authorities began to consider a great number of different types of property as forty shilling freeholds. Subsequently, the residence requirement disappeared.

Reform 
Until the Great Reform Act of 1832, each county continued to send two Knights (apart from Yorkshire, which had its number of Knights increased to four in 1826). How these knights were chosen varied from one county to the next and evolved over time. The 1832 Act increased the number of Knights sent by some populous counties to as many as six.

Modern usage 
The term became obsolete due to the final destruction of counties mentioned by the Redistribution of Seats Act 1885 and widened structure of electorate in the Reform Act of 1884 (the Third Great Reform Act), and in the Representation of the People Act of 1918. The term rapidly died out during the 20th century in reference to Members of Parliament who represent county constituencies; for they no longer represented a whole county.

The term occasionally features as journalese to describe elderly Members of Parliament, usually any Conservative backbenchers with long service who possess a knighthood.

See also
House of Commons of England
Parliament of Scotland
Knights of Buckinghamshire

References

Citations

Sources
The text of the 1832 Reform Act
 Chronological Table of the Statutes: Part 1 1235-1962 (The Stationery Office Ltd 1999)
 Electoral Reform in England and Wales, by Charles Seymour (David & Charles Reprints 1970)
 The Statutes: Revised Edition, Vol. I Henry III to James II (printed by authority in 1876)
 The Statutes: Second Revised Edition, Vol. XVI 1884-1886 (printed by authority in 1900)

Political history of the United Kingdom
Members of the Parliament of England (pre-1707)